Dezman Mirrill Moses (born January 4, 1989) is a former American football linebacker. He was signed by the Green Bay Packers as an undrafted free agent in 2012. He played college football at Tulane University after transferring from the University of Iowa. He has also played for the Kansas City Chiefs.

High school career
Born in Willingboro Township, New Jersey, Moses was a standout defensive end at Willingboro High School. As a senior, Moses garnered first-team all-county, all-conference, and all-South Jersey honors after being honored second-team all-county and all-conference as a junior. As a freshman and sophomore, he was named to third-team all-conference.

Professional career

Green Bay Packers
After going undrafted in the 2012 NFL Draft, Moses signed with the Green Bay Packers on May 11, 2012. He earning a spot on the Packers' 53-man roster in 2012. On October 28, 2012, Moses scored his first career touchdown by returning a blocked punt.

Kansas City Chiefs
Moses was claimed off waivers by the Kansas City Chiefs on September 1, 2013. On August 10, 2014, Moses was placed on the waived/injured list and after he cleared waivers, he was placed on injured reserve on August 12, 2014.

On September 10, 2016, Moses was released by the Chiefs. He was signed again by the Chiefs on September 14. He was released on October 7, 2016.

References

External links
Green Bay Packers bio
Tulane Green Wave bio

1989 births
Living people
People from Willingboro Township, New Jersey
American football defensive ends
American football linebackers
Iowa Hawkeyes football players
Tulane Green Wave football players
Green Bay Packers players
Kansas City Chiefs players
Sportspeople from the Delaware Valley
Willingboro High School alumni